Geraldine McNulty is an English stage and television actress.

She has played the character of Mrs Raven in My Hero, and had guest appearances in Neverwhere, Gimme Gimme Gimme, The Vicar of Dibley, The Smoking Room and The Catherine Tate Show. Radio work includes guesting on Parsons and Naylor's Pull-Out Sections and The Party Line.

She also appeared in French & Saunders' Titanic in 1998 as an extra. She also appeared in Summerhill as Zoe Readhead.

On stage she has starred in the musical "Betty", in London's West End.

A Guardian article (by Simon Fanshawe, 13 February 2003) once featured the comment, “Dawn French is off to deliver a birthday present to her best friend, the actress Geraldine McNulty”. The photographs in French's book "Dear Fatty" are also of McNulty: "BF" in that book would appear to refer to her.

Television Appearances

References

External links

Living people
English television actresses
Year of birth missing (living people)
20th-century English actresses
21st-century English actresses